Encephalartos manikensis (Gorongo Cycad, Gorongowe Cycad) is a species of cycad that is native to Mozambique and Zimbabwe.

Description
It is a cycad with an arborescent habit, with a stem up to 1.5 m high, sometimes with secondary stems originating from basal shoots. 
The pinnate leaves, arranged in a crown at the apex of the stem, are 1–2 m long, supported by a petiole 5–6 cm long, and composed of about 60 pairs of lanceolate leaflets, sometimes with 1-2 spines on the upper margin and lower, inserted on the rachis with an angle of 180°, reduced to thorns towards the petiole.
It is a dioecious species, with male specimens that have from 1 to 4 cylindrical-ovoid cones, erect, 25–65 cm long and 15–22 cm broad, light green, and female specimens with 1-2 ovoid cones, 30 –45 cm and width 20–25 cm,
The seeds are coarsely ovoid, 3–5 cm long, covered with a bright red sarcotesta.

References

External links
 
 

manikensis
Flora of Mozambique
Flora of Zimbabwe
Vulnerable flora of Africa
Plants described in 1939